Vokesimurex elenensis, common name the (Santa) Elena murex, is a species of sea snail, a marine gastropod mollusk in the family Muricidae, the murex snails or rock snails.

Description
The size of the shell varies between 40 mm and 105 mm.

Distribution
This marine species occurs in the Pacific Ocean from Baja California, Mexico, to Peru

References

 Houart R. (2014). Living Muricidae of the world. Muricinae. Murex, Promurex, Haustellum, Bolinus, Vokesimurex and Siratus. Harxheim: ConchBooks. 197 pp.

External links
 

Gastropods described in 1909
Vokesimurex